Dahban or Dahaban is an ancient village on the coast of Saudi Arabia (Red Sea). It is in Makkah Province, a few kilometers north of Jeddah.

For a long time, Dahban was a fishing center until Durrat Al-Arus opened in 1996, which made it also a tourist village. Dahaban lies on the main highway running along the west coast of Saudi Arabia between Jeddah and Rabigh. Dahaban has now turned into a picnic spot for families to visit fresh fish restaurants and in 2015, the first marine park was inaugurated, which attracted visitors.

References

See also

Dhahban Central Prison
Jeddah

Populated places in Mecca Province
Geography of Jeddah
Tourist attractions in Jeddah